Le jour du forain (English: The Travelling Showman's Day, Arabic: يوم العيد) is a 1984 Moroccan film co-directed by Abdelkarim Derkaoui and Driss Kettani.

Synopsis 
Moulay Yacoub is a fairground artist who earns his living from fair to fair, from village to village. The film follows his itinerary across the country as well as his spiritual journey.

Cast 

 Touria Jabrane
 Larbi Batma
 Hamid Zoughi
 Mostapha Salamat
 Salaheddine Benmoussa

References

External links 
 

1984 films